Yuxarı Maralyan (also, Yukhary-Maral’yan) is a village in the Jabrayil Rayon of Azerbaijan. It is currently uninhabited.

References 

https://qafqazinfo.az/news/detail/cebrayilin-9-kendi-isgaldan-azad-edilib-300573

Populated places in Jabrayil District